Brian Cameron Siders (born September 11, 1978) is an American world champion powerlifter and regular participant in the Arnold Strongman Classic. Brian is regarded as one of the strongest men to ever walk the planet, especially in press-movements.

Career
Brian started lifting in high school, mainly just training the bench press and upper body. Brian started focusing on squatting and deadlifting in the winter of 1997, and started doing full powerlifting meets in 1998. Brian trains 6–7 days per week and up to 4 hours at a time at his gym he built at his home. Brian has set several powerlifting world records, including a world record total of 2,452 lb at the 2004 USAPL Senior National Championships, and another world record total of 2,529 lb at the 2004 IPF World Championships. Brian held the IPF world record in the bench press of 775.5 lb (352.5 kg), and total (squat, bench press and deadlift) of 2,596 lb (1,180 kg) in the +125 kg (super heavyweight) weight class.

Personal records
Powerlifting Competition Records:

equipped
 Squat- 1,019 lb/462,5 kilo
 Bench Press - 799 lb/362,5 kilo
 Deadlift - 865 lb/392,5 kilo
 Total - 2,651 lb/1202,5 kilo
 The squat, bench and total are not official records because they were completed at a local powerlifting competition, and not at a national or international competition as one have to do to be counted as official records according to IPF rules.

raw (unequipped)
 Squat- 785 lb/356 kg.
 Bench Press - 650 lb/295 kg.
 Deadlift - 840 lb/381 kg.
 Total - 2,240 lb (785/635/820)

References

American strength athletes
American powerlifters
1978 births
Living people
Competitors at the 2005 World Games
World Games silver medalists